Happier Blue is an album by American singer/songwriter Chris Smither, released in 1993. It won a National American Independent Record Distributors (NAIRD) award.

Reception

Writing for Allmusic, critic Richard Meyer wrote of the album "All the elements of Chris Smither's distinctive style are here: passionate vocals, his cool songs, and some covers." Music critic Robert Christgau gave the album a two-star honorable mention and briefly commented "expansive new songs, congenial new band, and the stompingest foot this side of John Lee Hooker"

Track listing
All songs by Chris Smither unless otherwise noted.
 "Happier Blue"
 "Memphis in the Meantime" (John Hiatt)
 "The Devil's Real"
 "No More Cane on the Brazos/Mail Order Mystics" (Smither, Traditional)
 "No Reward"
 "Already Gone (Flatfoot Blues)"
 "Killing the Blues" (Rowland Salley)
 "Rock and Roll Doctor" (Lowell George)
 "Magnolia" (J. J. Cale)
 "Honeysuckle Dog"
 "Take it All"
 "Time to Spend"

Personnel
Chris Smither – vocals, guitar, foot percussion
Bill Urmson - bass
Robin Batteau - violin
Bill Brookheim - percussion
Brad Hatfield - keyboards
Bob Gay - saxophone
Mark Egan - bass

Production
Produced and engineered by John Nagy
Mastered by Toby Mountain

References

1993 albums
Chris Smither albums